Uttar Pradesh Sodic Land Reclamation III Project (UPSLR IIIP) is a land reclamation project in India, designed to reclaim 1,30,000 ha sodic lands in 28 sodic infested districts of the State of Uttar Pradesh. A pilot, to reclaim 5000 ha ravine land in two districts, Fatehpur and Kanpur Dehat, is also envisaged in the project.

A large number of the sodic lands holders, are from the most deprived and poorest section of the community and lack basic amenities. The project is developed to bring a significant agriculture and socio-economic development in the project area. The project includes all the activities which are essential in a farming system approach for favorable changes in overall farm income. The project has five components, four are technical and the last pertains to the management of the project.
On-Farm Development and Land Treatment
Improvement of Drainage Systems
Agriculture Support System
Institutional Strengthening for Improved Market Access
Project Management

Objectives 
The main objective is reversal of land degradation to achieve greater agricultural productivity by enhancement of soil fertility and improved provision of agricultural support services for farmers making a living on selected degraded agricultural land.

District coverage 
29 districts have been selected for the project. Azamgarh, Jaunpur, Ghazipur,  Sant Ravidas Nagar, Pratapgarh, Sultanpur, Ambedkar- nagar, Barabanki  Lucknow, Unnao, Raebareli, Hardoi, Sitapur, Fatehpur, Allahabad, Amethi, Kaushambi,  Kanpur Nagar, Kanpur Dehat, Etawah, Auraiya, Kannauj, Farrukhabad  Aligarh, Bulandsahar, Firozabad, Mainpuri, Etah and Kanshiram nagar.

Key performance indicators 
Increase in productivity of rice and wheat
Diversification in agriculture production
Increase in farm income

Expected results 
Improved soil quality
Increased productivity
Higher cropping intensity.

References

Agriculture in Uttar Pradesh
Land reclamation
Geography of Uttar Pradesh